The Stade des Alpes is a rugby and football stadium in Grenoble, France. The stadium seats 20,068 and hosts the home games of Grenoble Foot 38 and the FC Grenoble rugby club. Situated in Paul Mistral Park, it replaced their stadium Stade Lesdiguières. It was built while GF38 played in the top divisions of French football, and had become somewhat of a white elephant when the club fell to the 4th division and attracted few fans. However, the stadium gained greater viability once FC Grenoble earned their most recent promotion to the Top 14 in 2012. Since 2014–15, with FC Grenoble now consolidated in Top 14, the club have changed their primary home from their traditional ground, Stade Lesdiguières, to Stade des Alpes. With GF38 returning to the second tier of French football in 2017, the side began to attract more fans again.

This stadium uses solar panels and produces more than 70,000 kWh per year.

The first goal scored there was by Ivorian striker Franck Dja Djedje, then at Grenoble on loan from Paris Saint-Germain F.C.

On February 10, 2017, it hosted a Six Nations Under 20s Championship match between France and Scotland with France winning 36 - 8.

2019 FIFA Women's World Cup
The stadium was one of the venues for the 2019 FIFA Women's World Cup.

Notes 

Alpes
Alpes
Alpes
Alpes
Sports venues in Grenoble
Sports venues completed in 2008
2019 FIFA Women's World Cup stadiums
21st-century architecture in France